This is a list of mayors of Novi Sad from 1 February 1748, when the city got royal free city status by Maria Theresa of Austria.

The Mayor of Novi Sad is the head of the City of Novi Sad (the second largest city in Serbia and the administrative center of the Autonomous Province of Vojvodina). The Mayor acts on behalf of the City, and performs an executive function in the City of Novi Sad. The current Mayor of Novi Sad is Milan Đurić (SNS). He was elected by the City Assembly on 26 October 2022, following the resignation of Miloš Vučević, who served as mayor from 2012 to 2022.

Habsburg monarchy / Austrian Empire / Austria-Hungary

 Ignjac Hajl (1748 – 1752)
 Pantelija Milanković (1752 – 1756)
 József Tir (1756 – 1766)
 David Racković (1766 – 1772)
 József Ridi (1772 – 1778)
 David Racković (1778 – 1784)
 József Ridi (1784 – 1786)
 Ferenc Kasonyi (1786)
 József Szopron (1786 – 1793)
 Dimitrije Bugarski (1789 – 1793)
 József Szopron (1800 – 1801)
 Franz Schtrwetzki (1801 – 1807)
 Andrea Odi (1807 – 1810)
 Grigorije Janković (1810 – 1822)
 Georgije Konstantinović (1822 – 1831)
 Franz Lang (1835 – 1836)
 Johann Kerber (1836 – 1839)
 Franz Lang (1839 – 1840)
 Jovan Kamber (1840 – 1848)
 Petar Zako (1848)
 Pavle Jovanović (1848 – 1849)
 Karlo Molinari (1849)
 Jožef Šimić (1849)
 Pavle Jovanović (1849 – 1850)
 Grigorije Jovišić (1850 – 1853)
 Gavrilo Polzović (1853 – 1861)
 Svetozar Miletić (1861 – 1862)
 Pavle Mačvanski (1862)
 Pavle Stojanović (1862 – 1867)
 Svetozar Miletić (1867 – 1868)
 Pavle Stojanović (1868 – 1869)
 Stevan Branovački (1869 – 1872)
 Pavle Mačvanski (1872 – 1874)
 Jovan Radanović (1878 – 1884)
 Stevan Peci Popović (1884 – 1902)
 Lajos Szalai (1902 – 1906)
 Vladimir Demetrović (1906 – 1914)
 Béla Profuma (1914 – 1918)

Kingdom of Serbs, Croats and Slovenes / Kingdom of Yugoslavia

 Jovan Živojinović (1919 – 1920)
 Stevan Adamović (1920 – 1921)
 Milan Slepčević (1921 – 1922)
 Žarko Stefanović (1922 – 1925)
 Jovan Lakić (1926 – 1928)
 Branislav Borota (1928 – 1936)
 Branko Ilić (1936 – 1938)
 Kosta Milosavljević (1938 – 1939)
 Miloš Petrović (1939 – 1941)

Hungarian occupation

 Miklós Nagy (1941 – 1944)

DF Yugoslavia / FPR Yugoslavia / SFR Yugoslavia

 Alimpije Popović (1944 – 1949) (League of Communists of Yugoslavia)
 Dušan Ibročkić (1949 – 1951) (League of Communists of Yugoslavia)
 Radomir Radujkov (1951 – 1952) (League of Communists of Yugoslavia)
 Todor Jovanović (1952 – 1956) (League of Communists of Yugoslavia)
 Milosav Gonja (1956) (League of Communists of Yugoslavia)
 Boža Melkus (1957 – 1962) (League of Communists of Yugoslavia)
 Tima Vrbaški (1962 – 1967) (League of Communists of Yugoslavia)
 Dušan Ilijević (1967 – 1973) (League of Communists of Yugoslavia)
 Milan Čanak (1974) (League of Communists of Yugoslavia)
 Jovan Dejanović (1974 – 1982) (League of Communists of Yugoslavia)
 Branislav Dejanović (1982 – 1983) (League of Communists of Yugoslavia)
 Zdravko Mutin (1983 – 1984) (League of Communists of Yugoslavia)
 Aleksandar Horvat (1984 – 1985) (League of Communists of Yugoslavia)
 Boško Petrov (1985 – 1989) (League of Communists of Yugoslavia)
 Vlada Popović (1989 – 1992) (League of Communists of Yugoslavia)

FR Yugoslavia / Serbia and Montenegro

Republic of Serbia

See also
 History of Novi Sad
 Politics of Novi Sad
 President of the City Assembly of Novi Sad

References

 
Politics of Novi Sad
Novi Sad